The Suez Canal is commercial waterway connecting the Mediterranean Sea and the Red Sea. Suez Canal may also refer to: 

 Suez Canal Authority, which owns and maintains the Suez Canal
 Suez Canal Bridge, which crosses the Suez Canal
 Suez Canal Company, the French corporation that constructed the Suez Canal
 Suez Canal Stadium, a stadium located in Suez
 Suez Canal University, a university serving the Suez area
 Suez Canal Container Terminal, a shipping terminal at the northern end of the canal

See also 
Suez Canal overhead line crossing, an important electrical power line built across the Suez Canal
Suez Canal Area Development Project, an Egyptian mega-project around the Suez
Société d'Études du Canal de Suez, a French society to study the possibility of building a Suez Canal
New Suez Canal, an Egyptian development project
Suez (disambiguation)